Descanso Gardens is a  botanical garden located in La Cañada Flintridge, Los Angeles County, California.

Descanso gardens features a wide area, mostly forested, with artificial streams, ponds, and lawns. Descanso Gardens has a wide collection of fruit trees, including orange, peach, pear, pomegranate, crabapple, fruits of the genus prunus, grapes, and passionfruit.

History
The first Spanish governor of California deeded this land as part of a vast 36,000-acre rancho to Corporal José María Verdugo in 1784 for his loyal service. The property remained in the Verdugo family until 1869.

In 1937, the property was purchased by E. Manchester Boddy, owner of The Los Angeles Illustrated Daily News, and managed as a working ranch, which he called Rancho del Descanso. He built a two-story mansion of 22 rooms, designed by Beverly Hills architect James E. Dolena. He also purchased more than 400 acres north of the original property, the source of mountain streams that provide water for Descanso Gardens today. In 1942, when people of Japanese ancestry were forced into internment camps following the attack on Pearl Harbor, Boddy purchased up to 100,000 camellia plants from two Japanese-owned nurseries in the San Gabriel Valley run by his friends, the Uyematsu and Yoshimura families. He built his camellia collection – and later his rose and lilac collections – assisted by horticulturist J. Howard Asper and hybridizer Dr. Walter E. Lammerts.

In 1953, Boddy sold this property to Los Angeles County and moved to San Diego County. Four years later, local volunteers formed the Descanso Gardens Guild, Inc. Now a 501(c) organization, the Guild today manages all garden operations in a public/private partnership with Los Angeles County.  The gardens were listed on the National Register of Historic Places in 2021.

In 1995, the gardens were featured in Visiting... with Huell Howser Episode 310.

General Information 
General Admissions Tickets are 15 dollars. There is a senior and student discount for 11 dollars. Children 5 to 12 are 5 dollars and children under 5 are free. Descanso Gardens offers a membership that allows extra benefits. There are 7 different membership plans ranging in price from 70 dollars to 1000+ dollars. Each plan allows for a different number of guests to enter the gardens free of charge for a year. Other benefits include discounts on the gift shop, food, and special events. The normal hours are from 9am to 5pm, but members are allowed to enter at 8am. The gardens are open everyday of the year besides Christmas Day.

Layout 
When you first enter the property there is a large parking lot in front of the entrance. In the entrance is the admissions building where you can buy a ticket, the restaurant, as well as a gift shop. It is not required to buy an admissions ticket to enter the restaurant or the gift shop. In order to enter the gardens you must buy an admissions ticket and have it checked before you enter, unless you are a member. When you pass the entrance you enter the center circle. Oftentimes there is an information desk where employees at Descanso Gardens help guests with planning their visit in the gardens in the center circle. At the center circle the employees also provide a map of Descanso Gardens. Guests are then free to explore the gardens at their leisure. There are sixteen different locations you can visit in the gardens listed on the map. There are also many different buildings and structures marked on the map that guests may explore.

Collections
 Ancient Forest

 California Garden
 Camellia Forest

 Promenade
 Japanese Garden
 Lilac Garden
 Hilltop Gardens

 Oak Grove

 Oak Woodland
 Rose Garden

Animals 
Descanso Gardens homes many different animal species native to the area. The species native to La Canada Flintridge include deer, mountain lions, birds, snakes, and squirrels. Many of these animals feed on the plants in the gardens as well as live in the plant life.

Boddy House
The Boddy House is the original 22-room mansion built by E. Manchester Boddy and designed by James Dolena in the Hollywood Regency style in 1937. The house is located in the far southeast corner of the property, overlooking the San Gabriel Mountains.

In 2007, the Boddy House was rehabilitated for the 43rd annual Pasadena Showcase House of Design, and decorated in a contemporary re-interpretation of its original Hollywood Regency style. Subsequently, a major grant from the Ahmanson Foundation enabled the addition of a museum-quality Heritage Exhibit, with exhibits about the gardens, Manchester Boddy's life and times, and important donors and volunteers for the Descanso Gardens. Executive Director David Brown led the 2007 rehabilitation of the Boddy House; he planned to retire in 2017 after 12 years leading the botanic gardens. In 2019, the Boddy House was once again reimagined by Showcase House designers.

Sturt Haaga Gallery

The Sturt Haaga Gallery opened in the autumn of 2011. The gallery is named for the initial gift of $2.1 million from Heather Sturt Haaga and Paul G. Haaga, Jr. Other donations followed, also from private entities.

Boddy's original garage was restored and houses two galleries. The facility was enhanced by the addition of a contemporary structure which doubled the size for exhibitions and with its  ceilings allowed larger single pieces of art, completing the rehabilitation of site buildings begun in 2007. The contemporary structure was designed by the architects Frederick Fisher & Partners and completed in 2011.

The Gallery presents three exhibitions per year. The focus is on work by contemporary artists that portrays themes and subjects relevant to its setting in the Descanso Gardens. The first exhibit of 2014 included works by over 150 contemporary artists, some entered in a jury competition, others commissioned by the Gardens. The exhibition involved contemporary photographs of the Descanso Gardens in a video gallery, using the hashtag #Portraitsofthegarden to collect the photos from social media web sites Twitter and Instagram.

In the first half of 2023 the Sturt Haaga Gallery is showing the exhibit SHIKI: The Four Seasons in Japanese Art. The exhibit is from Scripps College collection. The collection includes Kimonos and paintings that display the four seasons.

Food 
Before you enter Descanso Gardens there is a place go get food called The Kitchen at Descanso. Some of the items on the menu include items grown in the gardens. It also includes drink items like coffee, house made hibiscus lemonade, as well as alcoholic beverages.

Descanso Gardens also does catering for various events. It most often caters for weddings as the gardens are also a popular venue for weddings.

Activities 

Aside from the gardens themselves there are some other activities Descanso Gardens offers. The Enchanted Railroad is a small diesel train that the gardens allows guests to ride on. It has a track that circles around the promenade garden. The train is open from 10am to 4pm and costs 5 dollars to ride.  In the Japanese Garden there is a tea house where events are held on occasion. There is also an Amphitheater on the main lawn of Descanso Gardens.

Events 
Descanso holds many small events in the gardens including yoga, tours, and events for members only. Other large events include Enchanted and Carved. Every year Descanso Gardens has a light and art show called Enchanted. There is a set path that guests walk through and see all the lights as well as art instillations. Carved is a halloween themed event that has carved pumpkins as well as other typical halloween activities every year.

References

External links
Official  Descanso Gardens website

Botanical gardens in California
Parks in Los Angeles County, California
Museums in Los Angeles County, California
Historic house museums in California
Institutions accredited by the American Alliance of Museums
La Cañada Flintridge, California
National Register of Historic Places in Los Angeles County, California